The 22nd Ankara International Film Festival was a film festival held in Ankara, Turkey, which ran from March 17 to 27, 2011. Films were screened at Batı Movie Theater, Büyülü Fener Kızılay, Çankaya Municipality Contemporary Arts Center and the Goethe Institut Ankara, and the Street of Art events took place across the city. Polish filmmaker Jerzy Skolimowski was the guest of honor at the festival which included a retrospective of his work.

This edition of the Ankara International Film Festival, organized by The World Mass Media Research Foundation and accredited by FIPRESCI, opened with a gala on the evening of March 16 at the Ministry of Education Assembly Hall, at which the foundation special awards were presented, and the Emre Kartarı Jazz Band performed film music.

The festival concluded with an awards ceremony on March 27 at the Ministry of Education Assembly Hall, at which Derviş Zaim, whose film Shadows and Faces won the top award, announced "I will try to live up to this honor and I will continue making films that take risks."

A total of 620 films were submitted to the competition and screening sections of this edition of the festival.

Awards

National Feature Film Competition Awards
 Best Film: Shadows and Faces directed by Derviş Zaim.
 Mahmut Tali Öngören Special Award:  White as Snow directed by Selim Güneş.
 Best Director: Derviş Zaim for Shadows and Faces.
 SİYAD Best Film Award: Shadows and Faces directed by Derviş Zaim.
 Best Actor: Güven Kıraç for The Crossing.
 Best Actress: Popi Avraam for Shadows and Faces.
 Best Supporting Actor: Settar Tanrıöğen for Shadows and Faces & Majority.
 Best Supporting Actress: Sinem İslamoğlu for  White as Snow.
 Onat Kutlar Best Script Award: Sedat Yılmaz for Press.
 Most Promising New Director: Sedat Yılmaz for Press.
 Most Promising New Script Writer: Selim Güneş for  White as Snow.
 Jury Special Performance Prize: Didem Soylu, Buse Kılıçkaya, Seyham Arman & Ayta Sözeri Other Angels.
 Most Promising New Actor: Aram Dildar for Press & Bartu Küçükçağlayan for Majority.
 Best Cinematographer: Türksoy Gölebeyi for The Voice
 Best Art Director: Elif Taşçıoğlu for Shadows and Faces
 Best Original Music: Mehmet Cem Ünal & Safa Hendem for The Voice
 Best Editor: Aylin Zoi Tinel for Shadows and Faces

National Short Film Competition Awards
 Best Short Fiction Film: Bicycle directed by İ. Serhat Karaaslan.
 Best Short Experimental Film: Tananore Love directed by Ebru Güney.
 Best Short Animation Film: Istanbul directed by İdil Ar.
 Special Short Film Competition Jury Prize: 38 Degrees directed by Ömer Sinir.

National Documentary Film Competition Awards
 Best Student Documentary Film: Mada directed by Musa Ak.
 Best Professional Documentary Film: ...Leaving Behind directed by Mehmet Özgür Candan.

Foundation Special Awards
 Hasan Saltık (founder of Kalan Müzik)
 Suna Kan (violinist)
 Sezer Sezin (actress)

National Programmes

National Feature Film Competition

Films in competition
A pre-selection jury consisting of Sevilay Çelenk, Barış Kılıçbay and İnci Demirkol selected 10 films, from the 20 submissions received, to compete in the  National Feature Film Competition.

 Majority directed by Seren Yüce.
 Shadows and Faces directed by Derviş Zaim.
 Tales From Kars directed by Özcan Alper, Ülkü Oktay, Emre Akay, Ahu Öztürk and Zehra Derya Koç.
 The Crossing directed by Selim Demirdelen.
 Lost Freedom directed by Umur Hozatlı.
 White as Snow directed by Selim Güneş.
 Press directed by Sedat Yılmaz.
 Black and White directed by Ahmet Boyacıoğlu.
 The Voice directed by Ümit Ünal.
 Other Angels directed by Emre Yalgın.

National Short Film Programmes

National Short Film Competition Jury
 Ceylan Özçelik
 Emrah Serbes
 Çiçek Kahraman
 Stavros Chassapis
 İnan Temelkuran

Films in programme
A pre-selection jury consisting of Bülent Özkam, Cumhur Canbazoğlu and Prof. Dr. Oğuz Onaran selected 15 fictional, 7 animation and 13 experimental films to compete in the National Short Film Competition. Also 23 films were selected to be shown out of competition.

Fiction films in competition
 The Curse of The Apple directed by H.Doğan Ercan.
 The Cello directed by Necmettin Sancak.
 Gloomy Mornings directed by Serhat Eser Erdem.
 Silence directed by Aziz Çapkurt.
 Bicycle directed by İ. Serhat Karaaslan.
 Blood directed by İ. Serhat Karaaslan.
 The Father directed by Şenol Çöm.
 Coffee Job directed by Tuğçe Sönmez.
 The Paper Murderers directed by Selin Cevizli.
 The Uşak Thing directed by Yusuf Emirdar.
 Movie or Movie directed by Şükrü Apaydın.
 Moment directed by Ayşegül Okul.
 Waiting directed by Burak Çevik and Kutay Denizler.
 Endeavour directed by Bahadır Erturun.
 The Stairway directed by İbrahim Sena Kandazoğlu.

Experimental films in competition
 The Crow directed by Alper Öztekin.
 Fragment directed by Ali İhsan Elmas.
 Nothing directed by Eytan İpeker.
 Shadow directed by Bilgi Diren Güneş.
 Tananore Love directed by Ebru Güney.
 Life in Parentheses directed by Zafer Ulufer.
 Ankara Nox directed by Özlem Mengilibörü.
 Pent Pa directed by Demet Öztürk.
 About The Old World directed by Bilal Çakay.
 38 Degrees directed by Ömer Sinir.
 Memories From The Future directed by Hüseyin Mert Erverdi.
 Highway Screening directed by Yoel Meranda.
 Expectations directed by Ethem Özgüven.

Animation films in competition
 Müsait in Somewhere directed by Orhan Başara.
 Grain directed by Anıl Tortop.
 Slumberland directed by Işık Dikmen.
 Istanbul directed by İdil Ar.
 One Random Day in Istanbul directed by Nurbanu Asena.
 The Owl Who Had a Wish Tangled to its Foot directed by Burak N. Kurt.
 Wind directed by Murat Kılıç.

Out of competition screenings
 For Rent directed by Emre Karapınar and İsmail Onay.
 Big Little directed by Emre Karakaş and Kevser Kulalıgil.
 Dis-Ko directed by Yasin Fatih Bayram.
 Untitled directed by Mehmet Nuri Çetin.
 The Ottoman directed by Hakan Burcuoğlu.
 Success directed by Selim Akgül.
 The Separation directed by Erdem Çiçek.
 Road to School directed by Yiğitalp Ertem.
 Beast directed by Can Sever.
 Egoist directed by Tuğçe Tunç.
 American Billiard directed by Orhun Bora Çetin.
 The Stranger directed by Sedat Azazi and Bilal Çakay.
 Five Stone directed by Kenan Tekeş and Rıza Barut.
 Ş's Death directed by Hatice Aydoğdu.
 Elif directed by Ferit Ürük.
 The Walkman directed by Emre Karataş.
 Gren directed by Volkan Karagül.
 The Puppet directed by Kemal Tezcan.
 5 Liras directed by İ. Serhat Karaaslan.
  directed by Y.Ilgaz Irmak.
 I Know I Don't Smell Good directed by Cenk Ertürk.
 Letter directed by Göktan Göktaş.

National Documentary Film Programmes

National Documentary Film Competition Jury
 Ali Karadoğan
 Emel Çelebi
 Kurtuluş Özgen
 Necla Algan
 Thomas Balkenhol

Films in programme
A pre-selection jury consisting of Ahmet Gürata, Bülent Özkam and Ersan Ocak selected 7 student and 11 professional documentaries to compete in the National Documentary Film Competition. Also 2 documentaries were selected to be shown out of competition.

Student films in competition
 My Father Is Making History directed by Haydar Demirtaş.
 Autumn in Bayrampasa directed by Cem Terbiyeli.
 Gülay Master directed by Selin Altay.
 Nasty Age directed by Cahit Çeçen.
 Mada directed by Musa Ak.
 Life Birds directed by Hüdai Ateş.
 Urbanbugs directed by Aykut Alp Ersoy.

Professional films in competition
 ...Leaving Behind directed by Mehmet Özgür Candan.
 One Step Beyond directed by Tülin Dağ.
 A Philately Story directed by Ümit Topaloğlu.
 Daredevils directed by Serdar Güven.
 Dream Gang directed by Seyfettin Tokmak and Kenan Kavut.
 While Everyone Else Sleeps directed by Erdem Murat Çelikler.
 İfakat directed by Orhan Tekeoğlu.
 Offside directed by Reyan Tuvi.
 My Letter to Pippa directed by Bingöl Elmas.
 Selahattin's Istanbul directed by Aysim Türkmen.
 Brutal Consciences directed by Cenk Örtülü and Zeynel Koç.

Out of competition screenings
 We Won’t Let You Touch Our Water directed by Cihat Bilen.
 Your Son, Erdal directed by Tunç Erenkuş.

See also 
 2011 in film
 Turkish films of 2011

External links
  for the festival

References

2011 film festivals
Ankara International Film Festival
Ankara International Film Festival 22nd
22nd Ankara International Film Festival
2010s in Ankara